Zardozi or zar-douzi or zarduzi (from Classical Persian زَردوزی zardōzī, literally "gold embroidery"; ; , ,), is an Iranian, Indian-subcontinent and Central Asian embroidery type. Zardozi comes from two Persian words: zar or zarin meaning 'gold', and dozi meaning 'sewing'. Zardozi is a type of heavy and elaborate metal embroidery on a silk, satin, or velvet fabric base. Designs are often created using gold and silver threads and can incorporate pearls, beads, and precious stones. It is used as decoration for a wide range of applications, including clothes, household textiles, and animal trappings. Historically, it was used to adorn the walls of royal tents, scabbards, wall hangings and the paraphernalia of regal elephants and horses.

Initially, the embroidery was done with pure silver wires and real gold leaves. However, today, craftsmen make use of a combination of copper wire, with a golden or silver polish, and silk thread.

Iran
Zardozi is an important handicraft in Persian culture. It is known around the country by names such as zar-douzi, kam-douzi, gol-douzi and kaman-douzi. Nowadays it is more popular in Hormozgan, especially in Bandar-e Lenge, Bandar-e Abbas, and Minab.

Persian zardozi is of three kinds:

 Some people completely sew the basic fabric with Bakhie in order to produce novel patterns and colors, such as the Baloch's Souzan-douzi, Rasht's Qollab-douzi and Kerman's Pate-douzi.
 Some sew with less density of work on the original fabric. They cross the strings throughout the woof of the fabric and sew them to each other to form a colorfully patterned lattice, such as sekke-douzi or qollab-douzi in Isfahan.
 A third way is to sew a variety of patterns on the original fabric with gold and silver strings, such as Dah-Yek-Douzi, Naqade-douzi, Tafte-douzi, Kous-douzi Zari-douzi or Golabatoun-douzi.

Indian subcontinent

Gold embroidery has existed in the subcontinent  since the time of the Rigveda, between 1500 and 1200 BC. It prospered during the 17th century during the reign of the Mughal emperor Akbar, but later a loss of royal patronage and industrialization led to its decline. The craft began to experience a resurgence in popularity following India's independence in 1947.

Today, zardozi is popular in the Indian cities of Lucknow, Hyderabad, Farrukhabad, Chennai and Bhopal. In 2013, the Geographical Indication Registry (GIR) accorded Geographical Indication (GI) registration to the Lucknow zardozi. With GI status, zardozi artisans, distributors, and retailers in Lucknow and the six surrounding districts of Barabanki, Unnao, Sitapur, Rae Bareli, Hardoi and Amethi can become authorized users of the "Lucknow Zardozi" brand and carry a unique mark of authenticity.

Zardozi is a popular embroidery choice across Pakistan especially for wedding or formal wear, with artisans and couture houses alike producing clothing with zardozi work

Central Asia
Zardozi has also been present in Tajikistan and Uzbekistan since ancient times.

References

External links
 

Culture of Lucknow
Embroidery in India
Pakistani embroidery
Turkish embroidery
Azerbaijani embroidery
Kuwaiti embroidery
Iraqi embroidery
Persian embroidery
Persian handicrafts
Iranian clothing
Persian words and phrases
Economy of Lucknow
Tajikistani culture
Uzbekistani culture